Mu'nas Dabbur (sometimes Moanes Dabour or Muanes Dabur, ; born 14 May 1992) is an Israeli professional footballer who plays as a striker for German Bundesliga club 1899 Hoffenheim.

Early life
Dabbur was born in Nazareth, Israel, to an Arab-Muslim family of Palestinian descent. His brother Anas Dabbur is also a footballer, who currently plays as a midfielder for Maccabi Ahi Nazareth. Dabbur's father Kasam died in a car accident in 2009.

Club career
Dabbur started his career in the Israeli Maccabi Nazareth and Maccabi Tel Aviv youth academies.

Maccabi Tel Aviv
He made his senior debut with Israeli Premier League club Maccabi Tel Aviv in 2011. In the 2011–12 season, he participated in 26 league matches for Maccabi, scoring eight goals.

In the 2012–13 Israeli Premier League season, he was part of Maccabi Tel Aviv's squad that has become champions after a ten-year drought spell, providing the team with 10 goals in 26 matches. Dabbur started the season providing two important goals on 27 August 2011 against Maccabi Haifa, goals that were described as "extremely crucial" for the rest of the season in the tight race for achieving the title.

Dabbur ended the season after being injured for a one-month period during the warm up to the derby match against Hapoel Tel Aviv on 6 April 2013.

Grasshoppers
On 4 February 2014, Dabbur confirmed his transfer to the Swiss Super League after its club Grasshoppers paid a transfer fee of $425,000 to his previous Israeli club Maccabi Tel Aviv. On 16 February 2014, he had his first appearance at Zurich, when he came on from the bench in the second half scoring two goals and assisting once in a 5–1 win against St. Gallen. Dabbur finished his debut season at Grasshoppers with nine goals and four assists in 15 league matches.

The 2014–15 season was comparatively less successful with Dabbur scoring 13 times in the league and five in the cup. He also provided 8 assists in the league, reaffirming his position as one of Grasshoppers' best and most valuable players.

During the summer of 2015, several clubs were rumoured to be interested in Dabbur, including German club Werder Bremen and Italian club Palermo. However, the only two clubs to bid for him were the aforementioned Palermo and his previous Israeli club Maccabi Tel Aviv. Both bids were rejected and Dabbur signed a new, greatly improved contract with Swiss club Grasshoppers. 

Dabbur enjoyed a good start to the 2015–16 Swiss Super League season, scoring eight and assisting eight goals in his club's first eight games including a goal and a hat-trick of assists in Grasshoppers' opening game against Thun.

Red Bull Salzburg
In May 2016, Dabbur signed with Austrian Bundesliga club Red Bull Salzburg for five years. During the 2017–18 season, Salzburg finished top of their Europa League group, for a record fourth time, before beating Real Sociedad and Borussia Dortmund thus making their first ever appearance in the UEFA Europa League semi-final. On 3 May 2018, he played in the Europa League semi-finals as Olympique de Marseille played out a 2–1 away loss but a 3–2 aggregate win to secure a place in the 2018 UEFA Europa League Final.

In February 2017, Dabbur was loaned mid-season back to his previous Swiss club of Grasshoppers, until the end of the season.

Sevilla
On 17 January 2019, Dabbur agreed terms to join Spanish La Liga club Sevilla. He agreed to a four-year contract, but stayed with his previous Austrian Bundesliga club Red Bull Salzburg until the end of the campaign. Dabbur made his debut with Sevilla during the 2019–20 La Liga matchweek 16, coming on as a substitute for Óliver Torres in the 78th minute, in a 1–1 tie at Osasuna.

1899 Hoffenheim
On 7 January 2020, it was disclosed that Dabbur had signed a contract until 2024 with German Bundesliga club 1899 Hoffenheim for a reported fee of 12 million euros.

International career

In 2013, Dabbur was part of the Israel U-21 national team that played in the 2013 UEFA European Under-21 Championship that was hosted in Israel. Dabbur started in two out of three matches during the group stage of the tournament, against the U21 national teams of England and Italy.

In May 2014, Dabbur was named by coach Eli Guttman in the senior Israeli national football team's 25-man squad to play two friendlies against Mexico and Honduras. He made his senior debut against Honduras in a 4–2 victory on 1 June 2014. He scored his first goal for the national team against Andorra in a 4–0 victory on 3 September 2015, in UEFA Euro 2016 qualification.

Dabbur announced his retirement from Israel, on 26 July 2022.

Career statistics

Club

International
Scores and results list Israel's goal tally first, score column indicates score after each Dabbur goal.

Honours
Maccabi Tel Aviv
 Israeli Premier League: 2012–13

Red Bull Salzburg
 Austrian Bundesliga: 2016–17, 2017–18, 2018–19
 Austrian Cup: 2018–19

Sevilla
UEFA Europa League: 2019–20

Individual
 Swiss Super League Top goalscorer: 2015–16
 Swiss Super League Top assist provider: 2015–16
 Swiss Super League Team of the Year: 2015–16
 Austrian Bundesliga Top goalscorer: 2017–18, 2018–19
 Austrian Bundesliga Player of the Year: 2018–19
Austrian  Bundesliga Team of the Year:  2017–18, 2018–19
Austrian Cup Top assist provider: 2016–17

References

External links

Dabour profile on Maccabi Tel Aviv official website

1992 births
Living people
People from Nazareth
Arab citizens of Israel
Arab-Israeli footballers
Israeli footballers
Association football forwards
Maccabi Ahi Nazareth F.C. players
Maccabi Tel Aviv F.C. players
FC Red Bull Salzburg players
Grasshopper Club Zürich players
Sevilla FC players
TSG 1899 Hoffenheim players 
Footballers from Nazareth
Israeli Premier League players
Swiss Super League players
Austrian Football Bundesliga players
La Liga players
Bundesliga players
Israel youth international footballers
Israel under-21 international footballers
Israel international footballers
Israeli expatriate footballers
Israeli people of Palestinian descent
Expatriate footballers in Switzerland
Expatriate footballers in Austria
Expatriate footballers in Spain
Expatriate footballers in Germany
Israeli expatriate sportspeople in Switzerland
Israeli expatriate sportspeople in Austria
Israeli expatriate sportspeople in Spain
Israeli expatriate sportspeople in Germany
Israeli Muslims